Windell Land District
Windell D. Middlebrooks, American film and television actor
Terry Windell, American film director
Windell Gabriels

See also
Windells